The Blunders is an animated children's television series co-produced by FilmFair and Central Independent Television, and broadcast on ITV in 1986.

Colin Voisey and Haydn Morgan created the show's characters: Ma Blunder, Pa Blunder, Bobby Blunder, Baby Blunder, a cat named Zebra, a dog named Trouble, and an eye-patched bird named Patch. They all live together in the town of Villa Shambles, where they keep finding trouble because of their clumsiness. In the episode "The Blunder Family Tree", the Blunders find that their ancestors lived in the Roman Empire.

Episodes

Home releases
Castle Vision distributed episodes of the series on VHS videotape. Each tape features 10 episodes.

See also
 The Stupids

Notes

References
 
The Blunders at the BFI Film & TV Database. Retrieved 6 January 2013.
. Retrieved 6 January 2013.
. Retrieved 6 January 2013.

External links
 

1986 British television series debuts
1987 British television series endings
1980s British children's television series
1980s British animated television series
Animated television series about families
British children's animated television shows
ITV children's television shows
English-language television shows
Television series by FilmFair
Television series by DHX Media
Television series by ITV Studios
Television shows produced by Central Independent Television